Hafiz or Hafez may refer to:

 Hafiz (Quran), a term used by Muslims for people who have completely memorized the Qur'an
Al-Ḥafīẓ, one of the names of God in Islam, meaning "the Ever-Preserving/ Guardian/ All-Watching/ Protector"

People
 Hafiz (name), including a list of people with the name
 Hafez, a 14th-century Persian mystic and poet. Sometimes credited as "Hafiz" or "Hafiz of Shiraz"
 Hafiz, starring role played by actor Ronald Coleman in Kismet (1944 film)
Abdel Halim Hafez, Egyptian singer

Places
 Hafez, Iran, a village in East Azerbaijan Province, Iran
 Tomb of Hafez, one of two memorial structures in Shiraz, Iran, erected in memory of the Persian poet Hafez

Others
 Hafez (opera), 2013 Persian-language opera by Behzad Abdi
 Hafiz (horse), French Thoroughbred racehorse
 Hafís (drift ice), work for choir and orchestra by Jón Leifs
 Al-Hafez, Salafi Islamist channel from Egypt.
 Hafez Awards, an annual awards ceremony which is held honoring cinematic achievements in Iranian cinema
 Khuda Hafiz, a parting phrase